Delissea kauaiensis is a critically endangered species of the bellflower family. It is found on Mt. Ha'upu near Hanapepe Falls, and Mahanaloa. It was thought to be extinct, but 10 individuals were found in 2016.

References

Lobelioideae
Endemic flora of Hawaii